The Donetsk People's Republic (DPR) is a disputed entity in eastern Ukraine's Donetsk Oblast. The DPR historically sought to be recognised as independent after breaking away from Ukraine but was annexed by Russia on 30 September 2022. The status is now as an unrecognised Russian republic.

The DPR is closely linked to the Luhansk People's Republic (LPR), which has a nearly identical political status and history of formation.

The DPR has foreign relations with Russia, North Korea, and Syria, as of July 2022. The DPR also maintains relations with South Ossetia and Abkhazia, two breakaway states that are claimed by Georgia. The DPR and LPR mutually recognise each other.

Foreign relations of the Donetsk People's Republic 

 – Donetsk People's Republic–Russia relations
 – Donetsk People's Republic–South Ossetia relations
Representative Office of South Ossetia, Donetsk

Embassies of the Donetsk People's Republic 

  – in 2014, the DPR opened a Representative Office in Moscow

  Crimea – in 2016, DPR sympathizers opened a Representative Office in Simferopol

  – in 2015, a DPR Representative Office opened in Tskhinvali

See also 
 List of diplomatic missions of the Luhansk People's Republic
 List of states with limited recognition

References 

Donetsk People's Republic
Politics of the Donetsk People's Republic
Foreign relations of the Donetsk People's Republic